Kent Steffes (born June 23, 1968 in Ann Arbor, Michigan) is a former professional beach volleyball player.

Steffes received his AAA beach rating while still attending Palisades High School.  He was named the 1986 National High School Player of the Year and was the nation's most highly recruited high school senior. In 1987 with partner Forrest Smith he won the World Championships in San Diego. He enrolled at Stanford University and played for one season before transferring to UCLA where he graduated with a degree in Economics. While a Bruin he joined the AVP Tour full-time in 1988. Steffes earned the AVP No. 1 ranking at age 22, the youngest player to do so in the history of the sport. 

Steffes and playing partner Karch Kiraly won the inaugural beach volleyball gold medal at the 1996 Summer Olympics. During the 1990s Steffes teamed with numerous partners to win over 110 events.

Steffes' career lasted from 1988 until 1999. As of October 2022, Steffes has the highest winning percentage in the history of the sport (48.6%) and in 2020 was inducted into the USA Volleyball Hall of Fame as All-Time Great Male Beach Player Award. 

Steffes graduated from UCLA in 1993 with a bachelor's degree in economics. That same year he was a member of the AVP Board of Directors, and served as Secretary. In 2000 he enrolled in the Graduate School of Business at Stanford, where he graduated in 2002. He has two children and lives in Los Angeles where he writes and works in the financial industry.

Steffes is the co-author of the book Kings of Summer: The Rise of Beach Volleyball. Together with his co-author Travis Mewhirter, it chronicles the rise of beach volleyball from a 1970s rebel culture to inclusion in the 1996 Atlanta Olympic Games. The book features an in depth look at the quarterfinal match which many consider the "Match of the Century."

Awards and honors
 "Most dominant player of the 1990s"
 USA Volleyball Hall of Fame Inductee (2020)- All-Time Great Beach Player
 CBVA Hall of Fame (2004)

References

External links
 
 
 
 
 

1968 births
Living people
American men's beach volleyball players
Beach volleyball players at the 1996 Summer Olympics
Olympic beach volleyball players of the United States
Olympic medalists in beach volleyball
Medalists at the 1996 Summer Olympics
Sportspeople from California